Montoya is an unincorporated community on the route of historic Route 66 in Quay County, New Mexico, United States. It is the site of the Richardson Store, which listed on the National Register of Historic Places.

Montoya was founded as a railroad stop and loading point in 1902. A Sinclair gasoline station operated from 1925 to the mid-1970s. The now-abandoned Casa Alta stone structure was the home of Maria and Tylvan Hendren.

See also

References

External links

Unincorporated communities in New Mexico
Unincorporated communities in Quay County, New Mexico
Ghost towns in New Mexico